Samuel Frederick Stanislaus Aspland-Robinson (born 3 January 1997) is an English rugby union player. His usual positions are wing or centre.  He represented England under-20s 6 times between 2016 and 2017.  He is currently unattached, most recently playing for Coventry in the RFU Championship, on loan from Leicester Tigers in Premiership Rugby.  He previously played for Harlequins.

Career
Aspland-Robinson signed for Harlequins straight from school and initially went on loan to Worthing.  He played for England under 20s in the 2016 World Rugby Under 20 Championship, including starting the final where England beat Ireland.

Aspland-Robinson signed a new contract with Harlequins on 22 March 2017 but then missed a year with an anterior cruciate ligament injury resulting in him joining Leicester Tigers in the summer of 2018.

Aspland-Robinson made his Leicester debut on 12 January 2019 in a Champions Cup match against Scarlets in Llanelli.

In March 2021, he was signed by Coventry on a deal which would see him remain dual registered with Leicester Tigers.  On 14th July 2021 it was announced Aspland-Robinson would remain with Coventry on a season long loan for the 2021-22 RFU Championship season.

On 1st July 2022 his release was announced by Leicester.

References

1997 births
Living people
English rugby union players
Harlequin F.C. players
Leicester Tigers players
Rosslyn Park F.C. players
Rugby union centres
Rugby union players from Buckinghamshire
Rugby union wings